Tortilia is a genus of moths in the Stathmopodidae family.

Selected species

 Tortilia charadritis (Meyrick, 1924)  (from Northern Africa to Pakistan)
 Tortilia flavella Chrétien, 1908 (from Algeria)
 Tortilia graeca Kasy, 1981 (from Greece)
 Tortilia hemitorna  (Meyrick, 1913) (from India)
 Tortilia pallidella Kasy, 1973 (from Iran)
 Tortilia parathicta  (Meyrick, 1913) (from India)
 Tortilia rimulata  (Meyrick, 1920) (from East Africa)
 Tortilia sidiota  (Meyrick, 1917) (from Pakistan)
 Tortilia trigonella (Zerny, 1935)  (from Moroccos)

References
ftp.funet.fi

External links
 Lepiforum e. V.

Stathmopodidae
Moth genera